N'Dour  (also Ndure,  Ndour, or Ndur ) is a typical Gambian and Senegalese patronym of the Serer people.  They are the same people but because the French colonised Senegal and the British colonised the Gambia, there are variations in spelling but pronounced the same way. They share the same surname with the 15th century Serer King of Saloum Maat Saloum Mbegani Ndour (reigned from 1494) also known as Mbegan Ndour.

People surnamed N'Dour/Ndure include :
 Alassane N'Dour (born 1981), Senegalese football player
 Astou Ndour (born 1994), Spanish basketball player
 Youssou N'Dour (born 1959), Senegalese singer and percussionist
 Maurice Ndour (born 1992), Senegalese basketball player
 Viviane Ndour, Senegalese singer and sister-in-law of Youssou N"Dour
 Rumun Ndur, Nigerian-born Canadian hockey player

Other
 N'Dour (JoJo's Bizarre Adventure), a fictional character appearing in JoJo's Bizarre Adventure

References

Serer surnames